John Timmons (1936 – 29 June 1984) was an Irish Gaelic footballer who played for club sides Annacurra and Seán McDermotts and at inter-county level with the Wicklow and Dublin senior football teams.

Career

Timmons first came to prominence at inter-county level alongside his brother Joe as a player with his adopted Wicklow, however, he was persuaded to join the Dublin] senior team in 1958. He made his first appearance for the team against Meath and ended his debut season with an All-Ireland medal after a defeat of Derry in the final. Timmons won five Leinster Championship medals in total, including one as team captain, while he also collected a second All-Ireland title after the 1963 final defeat of Galway. He also won back-to-back Railway Cup medals with Leinster.

Personal life and death

Although born in Dublin, Timmons spent much of his youth with his maternal grandparents in Annacurra, County Wicklow. He later worked as a haulage contractor with Cement Roadstone. Timmons died suddenly on 29 June 1984 while walking his dog by the Grand Canal.

Honours

Dublin
All-Ireland Senior Football Championship: 1958, 1963
Leinster Senior Football Championship: 1958, 1959, 1962, 1963, 1965 (c)

Leinster
Railway Cup: 1961, 1962

References

1936 births
1984 deaths
Dublin inter-county Gaelic footballers
Wicklow inter-county Gaelic footballers
Leinster inter-provincial Gaelic footballers